Peter M. Jorgensen (born June 22, 1935) is an American former Democratic member of the Wyoming House of Representatives, representing the 16th district from 2003 to 2011.

Early life and career
Jorgensen graduated from Bucknell University in 1957. He was consulting engineer and surveyor before running for the state legislature.

Jorgensen served as a trustee of the University of Wyoming for fourteen years  from 1989 to 2003. He was a member of the Democratic National Committee.

References

External links
Wyoming State Legislature - Representative Pete Jorgensen
Project Vote Smart - Representative Pete Jorgensen (WY)
Follow the money campaign contributions - Peter Jorgensen

Democratic Party members of the Wyoming House of Representatives
1935 births
Living people
Politicians from Berkeley, California
American Unitarians
People from Jackson, Wyoming